This is a list of defunct airlines of Lithuania.

See also
 List of airlines of Lithuania
 List of airports in Lithuania

References

Lithuania
Airlines
Airlines, defunct